Thomas J. Kalmanir (March 30, 1926 – October 12, 2004) was an American football player.

Born in Jerome, Pennsylvania, Kalmanir grew up in Jamestown, Pennsylvania. He played college football at the University of Nevada as a running back and return specialist.  At Nevada Tommy set numerous records and was a member of two bowl teams in 1947 and 1948, often considered two of the greatest teams in Nevada football history.  He was selected in the NFL draft in 1949 and played with the Los Angeles Rams and Baltimore Colts.  He was a member of the Rams' 1951 NFL Championship Team. While with the Rams he appeared as a guest on the television game show What's My Line? on September 14, 1952  and was the first contestant to be guessed right during the initial free guess round.

After retiring as a player, he coached in the CFL as well as for the Oakland Raiders, before becoming a businessman in the San Francisco Bay Area. He retired to Fresno, California.

References

External links
 Tommy Kalmanir, Playing Stats

1926 births
2004 deaths
American football running backs
Baltimore Colts players
Edmonton Elks players
Los Angeles Rams players
Nevada Wolf Pack football players
Oakland Raiders coaches
People from Mercer County, Pennsylvania
Players of American football from Pennsylvania